Beverley Anne Brentnall (born 21 February 1936) is a New Zealand former cricketer who played as a wicket-keeper. She appeared in 10 Test matches and 5 One Day Internationals for New Zealand between 1966 and 1973. She was New Zealand's first ODI captain, leading them at the 1973 World Cup. Three of the five ODIs in which Brentnall captained were won by her team. She played domestic cricket for North Shore, as well as playing three matches for Middlesex in 1964 and playing in South Africa in the 1970s, including for Southern Transvaal.

Career highlights
1966 tour to England. Conceded only 1 bye in the 3 Test series. Scored 84 not out, 2nd Test, 2nd innings at Edgbaston.

1969 v England at Auckland. 5 dismissals in an innings (3c 2st).

1972 v South Africa at Johannesburg. 6 dismissals in an innings (2c 4st).

References

External links

1936 births
Living people
New Zealand women cricketers
New Zealand women's One Day International captains
New Zealand expatriate sportspeople in England
North Shore women cricketers
Middlesex women cricketers
Central Gauteng women cricketers
New Zealand women Test cricketers
New Zealand women One Day International cricketers
New Zealand women cricket captains